Cooku with Comali (season 2) is the second season of the Tamil reality cooking TV show Cooku with Comali, that was aired first on 14 November 2020. This season was hosted by Rakshan. The grand finale was aired on 14 April 2021 and winner was Kani Thiru.

Contestants

Comalis 

Bala Jaganathan
Manimegalai
Pappu 
Pugazh
 Parvathy Saran 
Sakthi Raj 
Sarath Raj
Sivaangi Krishnakumar
Sunita Gogoi
Tiger Thangadurai

Pairings

Cook Pairings

Comali Pairings

Weekly Activities 
 Advantage Tasks
 Main Tasks

 
Weekly Activities

Guests

References

External links
Cooku With Comali on IMDb

Star Vijay original programming
2020 Tamil-language television seasons
Tamil-language television shows
Tamil-language game shows
Tamil-language reality television series
Television shows set in Tamil Nadu